Rannulu Sameera Sadarange Saman de Zoysa (born 31 January 1987) is a Sri Lankan first-class cricketer who plays for Ragama Cricket Club. de Zoysa was part of Sri Lanka national under-19 cricket team in the 2006 Under-19 Cricket World Cup in Sri Lanka as wicket-keeper-batsman. He was the leading run-scorer for Ragama Cricket Club in the 2018–19 Premier League Tournament, with 515 runs in eight matches.

References

External links
 

1987 births
Living people
Sri Lankan cricketers
Ragama Cricket Club cricketers
Uva Next cricketers
Wayamba cricketers
Kurunegala Youth Cricket Club cricketers
Mannar District cricketers
Sportspeople from Kurunegala
Wicket-keepers